Surrender may refer to:

 Surrender (law), the early relinquishment of a tenancy
 Surrender (military), the relinquishment of territory, combatants, facilities, or armaments to another power

Film and television
 Surrender (1927 film), an American romance directed by Edward Sloman
 Surrender (1931 film), an American drama directed by William K. Howard
 Surrender (1950 film), an American Western directed by Allan Dwan
 Surrender (1987 film), an American comedy directed by Jerry Belson
 Surrender (1987 Bangladeshi film), a film directed by Zahirul Haque
 "Surrender" (Charmed 2018 TV series), a television episode
 "Surrender" (Outlander), a television episode
 "Surrender" (Third Watch), a television episode

Music

Albums
 Surrender (Bizzle album) or the title song, 2015
 Surrender (The Chemical Brothers album) or the title song, 1999
 Surrender (Debby Boone album) or the title song, 1983
 Surrender (Diana Ross album) or the title song (see below), 1971
 Surrender (Hurts album) or the title song, 2015
 Surrender (Javine album) or the title song "Surrender (Your Love)" (see below), 2004
 Surrender (Jeff Deyo album), 2005
 Surrender (Kut Klose album) or the title song, 1995
 Surrender (Kutless album), 2015
 Surrender (Maggie Rogers album), 2022
 Surrender (O'Bryan album) or the title song, 1986
 Surrender (Rüfüs Du Sol album) or the title song, 2021
 Surrender (Sarah Brightman and Andrew Lloyd Webber album) or the title song, from Sunset Boulevard (see below), 1995
 Surrender (EP), by Paint It Black, or the title song, 2009
 Surrender, by Camille Jones, 2004
 Surrender, by Hans Christian, 1996
 Surrender, by Jane Monheit, 2007

Songs
 "Surrender" (Billy Talent song), 2007
 "Surrender" (Cash Cash song), 2014
 "Surrender" (Cheap Trick song), 1978
 "Surrender" (The Collective song), 2012
 "Surrender" (Diana Ross song), 1971
 "Surrender" (Elvis Presley song), 1961
 "Surrender" (Laura Pausini song), 2002
 "Surrender" (Paul Haig song), 1993
 "Surrender" (Perry Como song), 1946
 "Surrender" (Suicide song), 1988
 "Surrender" (Swing Out Sister song), 1987
 "Surrender" (Tom Petty song), 2000
 "Surrender (Your Love)", by Javine, 2003
 "Surrender", by All Saints from Saints & Sinners, 2000
 "Surrender", by Angels & Airwaves from Love: Part Two, 2011
 "Surrender", by Ashlee Simpson from Autobiography, 2004
 "Surrender", by Ball Park Music, 2012
 "Surrender", by Birdy from Young Heart, 2021
 "Surrender", by Chancellor and Lyn from My Full Name, 2016
 "Surrender", by DD Smash from The Optimist, 1984
 "Surrender", by Debbie Harry from KooKoo, 1981
 "Surrender", by Depeche Mode, a B-side of the single "Only When I Lose Myself", 1998
 "Surrender", by Donna De Lory from In the Glow, 2003
 "Surrender", by Dropkick Murphys from The Meanest of Times, 2007
 "Surrender", by Electric Light Orchestra from A New World Record, 2006 reissue
 "Surrender", by Evanescence, 2001/2002
 "Surrender", by George Canyon from Better Be Home Soon, 2011
 "Surrender", by the J. Geils Band from Monkey Island, 1977
 "Surrender", by Jeremy Camp from Speaking Louder Than Before, 2008
 "Surrender", by Jhené Aiko from Chilombo, 2020
 "Surrender", by Joy Williams from By Surprise, 2002
 "Surrender", by Kasey Chambers from Carnival, 2006
 "Surrender", by k.d. lang from the Tomorrow Never Dies soundtrack, 1997
 "Surrender", by Kylie Minogue from Kylie Minogue, 1994
 "Surrender", by Lasgo from Far Away, 2005
 "Surrender", by Matt Brouwer from Unlearning, 2005
 "Surrender", by Mikuni Shimokawa, 2000
 "Surrender", by Mr. Mister from Pull, 2010
 "Surrender", by Natalie Taylor, 2015
 "Surrender", by Nine Lashes from From Water to War, 2014
 "Surrender", by Ólöf Arnalds with Björk from Innundir skinni, 2010
 "Surrender", by Paloma Faith from The Architect, 2017
 "Surrender", by Robbie Williams from Under the Radar Volume 1, 2014
 "Surrender", by Roger Taylor from Electric Fire, 1998
 "Surrender", by Roxette from Pearls of Passion, 1986
 "Surrender", by Sammy Hagar from Standing Hampton, 1982
 "Surrender", by Savatage from Poets and Madmen, 2001
 "Surrender", by The Smith Street Band from Throw Me in the River, 2014
 "Surrender", by Trixter from Trixter, 1990
 "Surrender", by U2 from War, 1983
 "Surrender", by Walk the Moon from What If Nothing, 2017
 "Surrender", by Your Memorial from Atonement, 2010
 "Surrender", from the musical Sunset Boulevard, 1993

Other uses
 Surrender (novel), a 2005 psychological thriller by Sonya Hartnett
 Surrender (religion), the relinquishment of one's own will to a spiritual power
 SurRender, now dPVS, a computer graphics tool produced by Umbra
 Surrender, the process of terminating an insurance policy in return for surrender value
 Surrender: 40 Songs, One Story, a 2022 memoir by Bono

See also 
 "Surrendered", a song by Chris Quilala from Split the Sky, 2016
 "Surrendering" (song), by Alanis Morissette, 2002
 "Surrendering", a song by Candlebox from Into the Sun, 2008
 Surender (disambiguation), an Indian name
 Surinder, an Indian name
 Submission (disambiguation)